Following is a list of people with the given name Rebecca:

A
Rebecca Abe (born 1967), German writer and illustrator
Rebecca Abergel (fl. 2000s–2010s), French chemist
Rebecca Adam (fl. 2010s–2020s), Australian lawyer and business executive
Rebecca Adamson (born 1950), American Cherokee businessperson and advocate
Rebecca Addelman (born 1981), Canadian comedian, writer, director and actress
Rebecca Adler-Nissen (fl. 2000s–2010s), Danish political scientist
Rebecca Adlington (born 1989), British competitive swimmer
Rebecca Akweley Adotey (fl. 1990s–2000s), Ghanaian politician
Rebecca Aguilar (born 1958), American journalist
Rebecca Akufo-Addo (born 1951), Ghanaian public figure
Rebecca Alexander (born 1979), American psychotherapist and author
Rebecca Allen (disambiguation), multiple people
Rebecca Alleway (fl. 2000s–2010s), English set decorator
Rebecca Allison (born 1946), American cardiologist and transgender activist
Rebecca Alpert (born 1950), American professor of Jewish American religious history
Rebecca Anderson (born 1991), American beauty pageant titleholder
Rebecca Andridge (fl. 1990s–2020s), American statistician
Rebecca Angus (born 1985), English football striker
Rebecca Anweiler (born 1959), Canadian visual artist 
Rebecca Agatha Armour (1845–1891), Canadian teacher and novelist
Rebecca Aronson (fl. 2000s–2010s), American poet
Rebecca Artis (born 1988), Australian professional golfer
Rebecca Naa Dedei Aryeetey (1923–1961), Ghanaian business woman, political activist and a feminist
Rebecca Kellogg Ashley (1695–1757), English child captured and raised by Haudenosaunee Mohawks
Rebecca Atkinson (disambiguation), multiple people
Rebecca Merritt Smith Leonard Austin (1832–1919), American amateur botanist and naturalist
Rebecca Ayoko (born c. 1960), Togolese international catwalk model

B
Rebecca Bace (1955–2017), American computer security expert
Rebecca Bailey (born 1974), New Zealand road cyclist
Rebecca Balding (1955-2022), American actress
Rebecca Ballhaus (born 1991), Pulitzer Prize-winning American journalist
Rebecca Barnard (born 1960), Australian musician
Rebecca Barnett (fl. 2000s–2010s), New Zealand squash player
Rebecca Lilith Bathory (fl. 2000s–2010s), British photographer
Rebecca Bauer-Kahan (born 1978), American attorney and politician
Rebecca Beardmore (fl. 1990s–2010s), Canadian contemporary printmaker, photographer and installation artist
Rebecca Bedford (born 1998), English para-badminton player
Rebecca Beeson (born 1997), Australian rules footballer
Rebecca Bell (born 1953), American environmental educational specialist
Rebecca Bellingham (born 1978), New Zealand badminton player
Rebecca Belmore (born 1960), interdisciplinary Anishinaabekwe artist 
Rebecca Bennett (brewer) (born 1983), American brewmaster 
Rebecca Bennett (born 1999), Australian 400m sprinter
Rebecca Benson (born 1990), Scottish actress
Rebecca White Berch (born 1955), justice of the Arizona Supreme Court
Rebecca Berg (disambiguation), multiple people
Rebecca M. Bergman (fl. 1980s–2020s), American chemical engineer and the President of Gustavus Adolphus College
Rebecca Best (born 1964), English-born professional squash player for Ireland
Rebecca Betensky (fl. 1980s–2010s), professor of biostatistics in the Harvard T.H. Chan School of Public Health
Rebecca Bigler (fl. 1980s–2010s), developmental psychologist
Rebecca L. Binder (fl. 1970s–2010s), American architect
Rebecca Birk (fl. 2010s–2020s), English Liberal Jewish rabbi
Rebecca Bisland (born 1982), Republic of Ireland international footballer
Rebecca Black (born 1997), American singer
Rebecca Blaikie (fl. 2000s–2010s), Canadian politician
Rebecca Blank (born 1955), American government official and academic administrator
Rebecca Blasband (born 1967), American singer-songwriter, screenwriter, and television personality
Rebecca Bluestone (born 1953), American artist and studio trained tapestry weaver
Rebeccah Blum (1967–2020), American art historian and curator
Rebecca Blumenstein (fl. 1990s–2010s), journalist and newspaper editor
Rebecca Blumhagen (fl. 2010s–2020s), American actress and filmmaker
Rebecca Wright Bonsal (1838–1914 or 1842–1914), American Quaker teacher
Rebecca Boone (1739–1813), American pioneer married to famed frontiersman Daniel Boone
Rebecca Borga (born 1998), Italian sprinter
Rebeccah Bornemann (born 1971 or 1972), Canadian para-swimmer
Rebecca Bossavy (born 1995), French handball player
Rebecca Botwright (born 1982), English professional squash player
Rebecca Bradley (disambiguation), multiple people
Rebecca Brandewyne (born 1955), American romance novelist
Rebecca Breeds (born 1987), Australian actress
Rebecca Wilson Bresee (fl. 1990s–2010s), American computer animator at Disney
Rebecca Brewer (born 1983), Canadian multi-disciplinary artist
Rebecca Brooke (1952–2012), American pornographic actress and model
Rebecca Bross (born 1993), American artistic gymnast and six-time World Championship medalist
Rebecca Broussard (born 1963), American actress and model
Rebecca Brown (disambiguation), multiple people
Rebecca Bryant (born 1963), Australian professional tennis player
Rebecca Buckley (born 1933), medical doctor and researcher of pediatric immunological diseases
Rebecca Budig (born 1973), American actress and television presenter
Rebecca Bulley (born 1982), Australia netball international player
Rebecca Bunting (fl. 2010s–2020s), Vice-Chancellor of the University of Bedfordshire
Rebecca Burlend (1793–1872), author of the journal and guide, A True Picture of Emigration
Rebecca Burns (fl. 2000s–2010s), journalist, professor, author, and speaker

C
Rebecca Caine (born 1959), Canadian soprano opera singer and musical theatre performer
Rebecca M. Calisi Rodriguez (born 1979), American neuroendocrinologist, wildlife biologist, and National Geographic Explorer
Rebecca Callard (born 1975), English actress and writer
Rebecca Camilleri (born 1985), Maltese athlete specialising in the long jump and sprinting events
Rebecca Cammisa (fl. 2000s–2010s), American documentary filmmaker
Rebecca Campbell (disambiguation), multiple people
Rebecca L. Cann (born 1951), American geneticist who made a scientific breakthrough on mitochondrial DNA variation and evolution in humans
Rebecca Cantrell (fl. 2000s–2010s), American author
Rebecca Cardon (born 1975), American actress and personal trainer
Rebecca Carrington (born 1971), English musical comedian
Rebecca Carroll (born 1969), American writer, editor and radio producer
Rebecca Carter (born 1996), Australian cricketer
Rebecca Caudill (1899–1985), American author of children's literature
Rebecca Chace (fl. 1990s–2010s), American novelist, playwright, screenwriter, and actor
Rebecca Chalker (born 1943), American health writer and women's rights activist
Rebecca Chamberlain (fl. 1990s–2010s), American visual artist and musician
Rebecca Chambers (disambiguation), multiple people
Rebecca Chan (born 1958), Hong Kong actress
Rebecca Chavez-Houck (fl. 1970s–2010s), member of the Utah State House of Representatives
Rebecca Chin (born 1991), British rower
Rebecca Chircop (born 1988), Maltese footballer
Rebecca Chiu (born 1978), Hong Kong squash player
Rebecca Chopp (fl. 2000s–2010s), chancellor of the University of Denver
Rebecca Chua (born 1953), Singaporean author
Rebecca Chan Chung (1920–2011), Chinese World War II veteran nurse with the Flying Tigers and the United States Army in China
Rebecca Parr Cioffi (fl. 1980s–2010s), American television writer, story editor and producer
Rebecca Clarke (disambiguation), multiple people
Rebecca Cliffe (born 1990), British zoologist
Rebecca Clough (born 1988), Australian rugby union player
Rebecca Cobb (fl. 2000s–2010s), British children's book illustrator
Rebecca Codd (born 1981), Irish-Australian professional golfer
Rebecca Cohn (born 1954), American politician in the California State Assembly
Rebecca Cokley (born 1978), American disability rights activist 
Rebecca Cole (disambiguation), multiple people
Rebecca Condie (born 1990), Scottish international field hockey player
Rebecca Cooke (born 1983), British competitive swimmer
Rebecca Copin (1796–1881), known for attempting to poison her husband with arsenic
Rebecca Copley (fl. 1980s–1990s), American soprano opera singer
Rebecca Corry (born 1971), American comedian, writer, and actress
Rebecca Costa (disambiguation), multiple people
Rebecca Cotton (born 1974), New Zealand basketball player
Rebecca Couch (1788–1863), American painter
Rebecca Cox (disambiguation), multiple people
Rebecca Craft (1887–1945), African American activist
Rebecca Creedy (born 1983), Australian swimmer
Rebecca Cremer (1924–2006), American alpine skier
Rebecca Cremona (fl. 2000s–2010s), Maltese film director
Rebecca Creskoff (born 1971), American actress
Rebecca Lee Crumpler (1831–1895), American physician, nurse and author
Rebecca Cryer (1946–2020), Oklahoma attorney, tribal officer, and judge
Rebecca Cummins (fl. 2000s–2010s), American photographer and multi-media artist
Rebecca Cunningham (disambiguation), multiple people
Rebecca Curran (born 1986), Scottish journalist and presenter
Rebecca Curtis (born 1976), American writer
Rebecca Coleman Curtis (fl. 1970s–2010s), American author, psychologist, and psychoanalyst

D
Rebecca Da Costa (born 1984), Brazilian actress and model
Rebecca D'Agostino (born 1982), Maltese football defender
Rebecca Dallet (born 1969), American lawyer and a justice of the Wisconsin Supreme Court
Rebecca Dalton (fl. 2010s), Canadian actress
Rebecca Daly (born 1980), Irish film director, screenwriter and actress
Rebecca de Pont Davies (fl. 2000s), British mezzo-soprano
Rebecca Davis (disambiguation), multiple people
Rebecca Nyandeng De Mabior (born 1956), South Sudanese politician
Rebecca de Alba (born 1964), Mexican model and TV presenter
Rebecca De Filippo (born 1994), Welsh rugby union player
Rebecca De Mornay (born 1959), American actress and producer
Rebecca De Unamuno (fl. 1990s–2010s), Australian actress and comedian
Rebecca Del Rio (1931–2010), Filipino actress
Rebecca Dempster (born 1991), Scottish footballer
Rebecca DerSimonian (fl. 1970s–2010s), American statistician
Rebecca Diamond (born 1967), contributor on the Fox Business Network and the Fox News Channel
Rebecca Dickinson (1738–1815), American gownmaker
Rebecca Dines (fl. 1980s–2010s), Australian actress
Rebecca DiPietro (born 1979), American model and professional wrestler
Rebecca Doerge (fl. 1980s–2010s), American researcher in statistical bioinformatics
Rebecca F. Doherty (born 1952), United States District Judge for the Western District of Louisiana
Rebecca Donovan (fl. 2010s), American novelist
Rebecca Lee Dorsey (1859–1954), American physician and endocrinology expert
Rebecca Dow (born 1973), American politician in the New Mexico House of Representatives
Rebecca Dowbiggin (born 1983), 7th woman to cox Cambridge in The Boat Race, the annual race against Oxford
Rebecca Drysdale (born 1970s), American comedian and writer
Rebecca Dubber (born 1993), New Zealand para-swimmer
Rebecca Dubowe (fl. 1990s–2010s), first deaf woman to be ordained as a rabbi in the United States
Rebecca Duckworth (born 2000), English cricketer
Rebecca Duncan (born 1971), Associate Justice of the Oregon Supreme Court
Rebecca Dunham (fl. 2000s–2010s), contemporary American poet
Rebecca Durrell (born 1988), British professional racing cyclist
Rebecca Dussault (born 1980), American cross-country skier
Rebecca Dwyer (born 1986), Australian field hockey player
Rebecca F. Dye (born 1952), Commissioner of the Federal Maritime Commission

E
Rebecca Eames (1641–1721), accused of witchcraft during the Salem witch trials of 1692
Rebecca Lane Hooper Eastman (1877–1937), American suffragist, journalist, and author of short stories
Rebecca Eaton (born 1947), American television and film producer
Rebecca Goodgame Ebinger (born 1975), United States District Judge for the Southern District of Iowa
Rebecca Eckler (born 1973), Canadian writer of columns, blogs, and books about motherhood
Rebecca L. Ediger (born 1952), United States Secret Service administrator
Rebecca Egan (fl. 1990s–2000s), British actress
Rebecca S. Eisenberg (fl. 1980s–2000s), American lawyer and professor
Rebecca Eisenberg (born 1968), American technology writer, lawyer, entrepreneur, and columnist
Rebecca Elgar (fl. 1990s–2010s), English children's book illustrator and writer
Rebecca Elloh (born 1994), Ivorian footballer
Rebecca Elson (1960–1999), Canadian–American astronomer and writer
Rebecca Emes (died 1830), English silversmith
Rebecca Enonchong (born 1967), Cameroonian born technology entrepreneur
Rebecca Evans (disambiguation), multiple people
Rebecca Ewert (born 1955), New Zealand diver
Rebecca Eynon (fl. 1990s–2010s), British educationalist specializing in the sociology of education

F
Rebecca Feldman (born 1982), Australian wheelchair racer
Rebecca Latimer Felton (1835–1930), first woman to serve in the United States Senate
Rebecca Ferdinando (born 1985), English actress
Rebecca Ferguson (disambiguation), multiple people
Rebecca Ferguson (singer) (born 1986), British singer and songwriter
Rebecca Ferguson (born 1983), Swedish actress
Rebecca Ferrand (fl. 1990s–2000s), film and television producer, line producer
Rebecca Ferratti (born 1964), American model
Rebecca Field (born 1990), English international lawn & indoor bowls player. Field was the 2013 World Indoor singles champion
Rebecca Field (fl. 2000s–2020s), American actress
Rebecca Fiorese (born 1980), Italian ice hockey player
Rebecca Fisher (disambiguation), multiple people
Rebecca Fitzgerald (born 1968), British medical researcher
Rebecca Foon (born 1978), Canadian cellist, vocalist, and composer from Montreal, Quebec
Rebecca Forstadt, American voice actress
Rebecca Fortnum (born 1963), British artist, writer, and academic
Rebecca Salome Foster (1848–1902), American missionary and prison relief worker
Rebecca Franklin (1803–1873), English schoolmistress, founder of the Nant Glyn school
Rebecca Franklin, Pittsburgh, Pennsylvania-based food writer for About.com, and various other media outlets
Rebecca Franks (1760–1823), prominent member of loyalist society in Philadelphia, Pennsylvania during the American Revolution
Rebecca Fransway (born 1953), American author and poet
Rebecca Fraser (born 1957), British writer and broadcaster
Rebecca Frayn, English documentary film maker, screenwriter, novelist and actress
Rebecca Frazier (fl. 200s–2010s), American singer-songwriter, multi-instrumentalist, bluegrass musician and educator from Virginia
Rebecca R. Freyre (born 1959), Judge of the Colorado Court of Appeals
Rebecca Frith, Australian actress
Rebecca Friedländer (1783-1850), German novelist and short-story writer
Rebecca Fromer (1927–2012), American playwright, historian and poet
Rebecca Front (born 1964), English actress, writer and comedian

G
Rebecca Gablé (born 1964), German author of historical fiction
Rebecca Gabriel (born 1948), American contemporary realist painter and figurative artist
Rebecca Gallantree (born 1984), British diver
Rebecca Garcia (computer programmer), American computer programmer from New York City
Rebecca Garcia (politician) (born 1973), Brazilian economist and politician
Rebecca Garfein, a notable hazzan (also called cantor)
Rebecca Gargano (born 1994), Italian fencer
Rebecca Gayheart (born 1971), American fashion model and actress
Rebecca George (born 1961), 
Rebecca Gergalo (born 2000), Finnish individual rhythmic gymnast
Rebecca Gethings
Rebecca Getzoff, American who worked for the KGB during World War II
Rebecca Ghilardi (born 1999), Italian pair skater
Rebecca Gibb, MW is a British journalist and Master of Wine based in England
Rebecca Gibney (born 1964), New Zealand-born actress
Rebecca Giddens (born 1977), United States slalom kayaker who competed from the mid-1990s to the mid-2000s
Rebecca Giggs, Perth-based Australian nonfiction writer
Rebecca Gilling (born 1953), Australian actress and environmentalist
Rebecca Gilman (born 1964), American playwright
Rebecca Gilmore (born 1979), Australian diver
Rebecca Godfrey, novelist and non-fiction writer
Rebecca Goldin, American mathematician
Rebecca Goldstein (born 1950), American philosopher, novelist, and public intellectual
Rebecca Gomperts (born 1966), doctor based in Amsterdam and is the founder of Women on Waves and Women on Web
Rebecca E. Gonzales (born 1963), American diplomat who is a career member of the Senior Foreign Service
Rebecca Goring (born 1994), Australian rules footballer with the Geelong Football Club in the AFL Women's competition (AFLW)
Rebecca Goss (chemist), professor of organic chemistry at the University of St. Andrews
Rebecca Goss (poet) (born 1974)
Rebecca Gottesman, professor at Johns Hopkins University, specializing in neurology and epidemiology
Rebecca Gould, writer, translator, and Professor of Islamic Studies and Comparative Literature at the University of Birmingham
Rebecca Gowland, bioarchaeologist
Rebecca Graeve (born 1993), German ice hockey player for EC Bergkamen and the Germany national team
Rebecca Grant (disambiguation), multiple people
Rebecca Gratz (1781–1869), preeminent Jewish American educator and philanthropist in 19th-century America
Rebecca Greenwell (born 1995), American basketball player
Rebecca Greer (born 1936), American nonfiction writer and also served as an editor for Woman's Day magazine
Rebecca Greiner (born 1999), Australian field hockey player
Rebecca Grinter (fl. 1990s–2000s), professor at the Georgia Institute of Technology (Georgia Tech)
Rebecca Grote (born 1992), German field hockey player, who plays as a midfielder
Rebecca Grundy (born 1990), English cricketer and coach
Rebecca Guarna, Italian physician, surgeon and author
Rebecca Guay, illustrator of role-playing games, collectible card games, comic books, and children's literature

H
Rebecca Haarlow (born 1978), American sideline reporter
Rebecca Hall (musician) (born 1965), American folk singer/songwriter
Rebecca Hall (born 1982), English actress, producer, writer, and director
Rebecca S. Halstead (born 1959), United States Army officer who was the first female graduate of West Point to become a general officer
Rebecca Hamilton (politician) (born 1948), politician in the Oklahoma House of Representatives
Rebecca Handke (born 1986), German pair skater
Rebecca Hankins, Africana Resources Librarian/Curator at Texas A&M University
Rebecca Hanover (born 1979), American television writer and young adult author
Rebecca Harms (born 1956), German politician who served as Member of the European Parliament (MEP) from 2004 until 2019
Rebecca Flores Harrington (born 1940s), labor activist from Texas
Rebecca Harris (filmmaker), British film producer
Rebecca Harris (born 1967), British Conservative Party politician
Rebecca Harrower (born 1996), Canadian synchronized swimmer, Harrower joined the national team in 2014
Rebecca Hart (born 1984), para-equestrian from Pittsburgh, Pennsylvania
Rebecca Hasson, American academic in the field of kinesiology
Rebecca Hawkins (disambiguation), multiple people
Rebecca Haynes (born 1984), basketball player from Australia
Rebecca Ross Haywood (born 1968), Assistant United States Attorney in the Western District of Pennsylvania
Rebecca Naylor Hazard (1826–1912), 19th-century American philanthropist, suffragist, reformer, and writer
Rebecca Hazelton (born 1978), American poet, editor and critic
Rebecca Hazlewood, British actress
Rebecca Heald, American professor of cell and developmental biology
Rebecca Heflin (born 1963), women's fiction and contemporary romance novelist living in Gainesville, Florida
Rebecca Heineman, American video game designer and programmer
Rebecca Henderson (disambiguation), multiple people
Rebecca Cohen Henriquez (1864–1935) 
Rebecca Hensler, founded the social media and internet support group "Grief Beyond Belief"
Rebecca A. Herb (born 1948), American mathematician and professor emerita at the University of Maryland
Rebecca Herbst (born 1977), American actress
Rebecca Heyliger (born 1992), Bermudian swimmer
Rebecca Hill (disambiguation), multiple people
Rebecca Alban Hoffberger (born 1952), founder and director of the American Visionary Art Museum
Rebecca Holcombe (born 1966), American educator and politician who served as the Vermont Secretary of Education from 2014 to 2018
Rebecca Holden (born 1958), American actress and singer
Rebecca Holloway (born 1995), professional footballer who plays as a midfielder for FA WSL club Birmingham City and the Northern Ireland national team
Rebecca Hollweg (born 1964), English singer-songwriter
Rebecca Honig, American voice actress
Rebecca Horn (born 1944), German visual artist
Rebecca Hornbrook (born 1975), atmospheric chemist at the National Center for Atmospheric Research (NCAR)
Rebecca G. Howard (1829–1881), prominent black businesswoman in the early years of the Pacific Northwest
Rebecca Lynn Howard (born 1979), American country music artist
Rebecca Howard (born 1979), Canadian Equestrian Team athlete
Rebecca Gayle Howell (born 1975), American writer, literary translator, and editor. In 2019 she was named a United States Artists Fellow
Rebecca Hoyle, professor of applied mathematics at the University of Southampton
Rebecca Hudson (born 1979), English professional golfer who plays on the Ladies European Tour
Rebecca Hunter (born 1981), British actress and singer
Rebecca Huntley (born 1972), Australian social researcher and expert on social trends
Rebecca Huxtable (born 1981), British radio personality and producer
Rebecca Hyland, British actress and voiceover artist
Rebecca Immanuel (born 1970), German actress

I
Rebecca Indermaur, Swiss film and television actress
Rebecca Isaacs (1828–1877), operatic soprano
Rebecca Ivers, Australian academic in the fields of injury prevention and trauma care research

J
Rebecca Jackson (disambiguation), multiple people including:
Rebecca Jackson (presenter) (born 1982), English racing driver and television presenter
Rebecca Cox Jackson (1795–1871), free Black woman, religious activist and autobiographer
Rebecca D. Jackson (born 1955), American medical researcher
Rebecca Jackson (politician), Republican politician from Louisville, Kentucky
Rebecca James (disambiguation), multiple people
Rebecca Jamieson, CM OOnt is a Canadian Tuscarora educator and education administrator
Rebecca Jarrett (1846–1928), English prostitute, procuress, and later reformer
Rebecca Jarvis (born 1981), American journalist
Rebecca Jasontek (born 1975), American competitor in synchronized swimming
Rebecca Jenkins (born 1959), Canadian actress and singer
Rebecca Grady Jennings (born 1978), United States District Judge for the Western District of Kentucky
Rebecca Jensen (born 1972), American professional tennis player
Rebecca Jockusch, Ph.D. (UC Berkeley, 2001), Canadian chemist
Rebecca Mammen John, Senior Advocate at the Supreme Court of India, and works primarily in the field of criminal defense
Rebecca John (born 1970), presenter and reporter for Wales Today, BBC Wales on British television.
Rebecca Johns (born 1971), author and educator
Rebecca Johnson (disambiguation), multiple people
Rebecca Johnston (born 1989), Canadian ice hockey player
Rebecca Jones (disambiguation), multiple people
Rebecca Jordan-Young (born 1963), American feminist scientist and gender studies scholar
Rebecca Richardson Joslin (1846-1934), American writer
Rebecca Joyce (born 1970), Australian rower
Rebecca Richardson Joslin (1846–1934), American author, lecturer, benefactor, clubwoman
Rebecca Judd (born 1983), Australian model, television presenter, and speech pathologist
Rebecca Julian (born 1986), Australian table tennis player

K
Rebecca Kabugho (born 1994), Congolese activist who was detained by the government
Rebecca Kadaga (born 1956), Ugandan lawyer and politician
Rebecca Kalu (born 1990), Nigerian footballer
Rebecca Kamau (born 1999), Kenyan swimmer
Rebecca Kamen (born 1950), American artist
Rebecca Kaplan (born 1970)
Rebecca Masika Katsuva (1966–2016), activist and a survivor of sexual assault
Rebecca Katz, professor and director of the Center for Global Health Science and Security at Georgetown University Medical Center
Rebecca Kavaler (1920–2008), short story writer and novelist, was born in the U.S. state of Georgia
Rebecca J. Keck (1838–1904), 19th-century woman physician and patent medicine entrepreneur and one of the wealthiest independent businesswomen in the Midwest
Rebecca W. Keller, incorporated Gravitas Publications Inc in 2003 to develop and publish core sciences curriculum under the Real Science-4-Kids imprint
Rebecca Kenna (born 1989), English amateur snooker and billiards player
Rebecca Futo Kennedy, Associate Professor of Classics, Women's and Gender Studies, and Environmental Studies at Denison University
Rebecca Keoghan
Rebecca Kershaw (born 1990), British water polo player
Rebecca Kiessling, American anti-abortion activist and attorney
Rebecca Kilgore (born 1949), American jazz vocalist
Rebecca Kilner, British evolutionary biologist, and a professor of evolutionary biology at the University of Cambridge
Rebecca Ann King (born 1950), most noted as holder of the 1974 Miss America title
Rebecca Rand Kirshner (born 1974), writer and producer for American television
Rebecca Kislak (born 1972), American attorney and politician in the Rhode Island House of Representatives
Rebecca Kiting (born 1991), Australian football (soccer) player
Rebecca Kitteridge (born 1960s), director of the New Zealand Security Intelligence Service
Rebecca Kleefisch (born 1975), American politician and television news anchor
Rebecca Kohler, Canadian stand-up comedian
Rebecca Love Kourlis (born 1952), Justice of the Colorado Supreme Court
Rebecca Krohn, American ballet dancer
Rebecca Kubacki, American politician in the Indiana House of Representatives

L
Rebecca Lacey (born 1965), English actress
Rebecca Lake (disambiguation), multiple people
Rebecca Lancefield (1895–1981), prominent American microbiologist
Rebecca Lange, Professor of experimental petrology, magmatism and volcanism at the University of Michigan
Rebecca Langlands, Professor of Classics at the University of Exeter
Rebecca Langrehr (born 1998), German modern pentathlete
Rebecca Hammond Lard (1772–1855)
Rebecca Lardner (born 1971), English artist. Her parents were a gamekeeper and a postmistress
Rebecca Lavelle (born 1980), Australian singer-songwriter
Rebecca Louise Law (born 1980), British installation artist
Rebecca Lee (disambiguation), multiple people
Rebecca Le'gon (born 1980), director and publisher
Rebecca Lemp (died 1590), German woman accused of witchcraft and burned at the stake in Nördlingen
Rebecca Lenkiewicz (born 1968)
Rebecca Lepkoff (1916–2014), American photographer
Rebecca Leslie (born 1996), Canadian ice hockey forward
Rebecca Levene
Rebecca Liddiard (born 1990s), Canadian actress
Rebecca Lim (born 1986), Singaporean actress
Rebecca Lingwood (born 1970), Provost and Professor of Fluid Dynamics at Brunel University London
Rebecca Linton (born 1985), New Zealand swimmer
Rebecca Llewellyn (born 1985), Welsh tennis player
Rebecca Lobo (born 1973), American television basketball analyst and basketball player
Rebecca Lock
Rebecca D. Lockhart (1968–2015), American politician and Republican member of the Utah House of Representatives
Rebecca Loebe (born 1983)
Rebecca Lolosoli (born 1962), founder and matriarch of the Umoja village in the Samburu County of Kenya
Rebecca Long-Bailey (born 1979)
Rebecca Loos (born 1977), Dutch personal assistant, glamour model, and media personality
Rebecca Lord (born 1973), French pornographic actress
Rebecca Lowe (born 1980), English television presenter and anchor
Rebecca Loyche (born 1979), American artist and curator
Rebecca Lukens (1794–1854), American businesswoman
Rebecca Luker (1961–2020), American actress, singer, and recording artist
Rebecca Lunn, MBE FRSE FREng FICE is a Professor and Head of the Centre for Ground Engineering and Energy Geosciences at the University of Strathclyde. I
Rebecca Lush (born 1972)
Rebecca Lusterio (born 1989), Filipino actress. She won the Gawad Urian and FAMAS awards. She is now married to a Danish national and is currently living in Denmark
"Rebecca Lynn", a song co-written by Skip Ewing and Don Sampson, originally recorded by Ewing on his 1990 album A Healin' Fire

M
Rebecca Jean MacDonald (born 1974), Canadian curler from Stratford, Prince Edward Island
Rebecca MacDonald (born 1953), Canadian businesswoman
Rebecca Macfie, New Zealand author and journalist
Rebecca MacKinnon (born 1969), author, researcher, Internet freedom advocate, and co-founder of the citizen media network Global Voices
Rebecca Macree (born 1971), professional squash player from England
Rebecca Maddern (born 1977), Australian television presenter and journalist
Rebecca Mader (born 1977), English actress
Rebecca Mahoney (born 1983), rugby union footballer and referee
Rebecca Makkai (born 1978), American novelist and short-story writer
Rebecca Hargrave Malamud, American photographer and website designer
Rebecca Malope (born 1968), multi-award-winning South African gospel singer
Rebecca Marino (born 1990), Canadian professional tennis player
Rebecca Mark-Jusbasche (born 1954), head of Enron International
Rebecca Marshall, noted English actress of the Restoration era
Rebecca Martin (born 1969), American singer and songwriter from Rumford, Maine
Rebecca Masisak (born 1957), CEO of TechSoup, a nonprofit organization that provides technical assistance to other nonprofits
Rebecca Massey (born 1969), Australian film, television and theatre actress
Rebecca Masterton, British Islamic scholar, educator, public speaker, academic, author, television presenter, and philosopher of the Shia Islam
Rebecca Matlock (1928–2019), American photographer
Rebecca May (born 2002), English footballer who plays as a midfielder for FA WSL club Manchester United
Rebecca Mbithi, lawyer, accountant and corporate executive in Kenya, the largest economy in the East African Community
Rebecca McClanahan (born 1951), Democratic Representative of the second district of the Missouri House of Representatives
Rebecca McConnell (born 1991), Australian mountain biker
Rebecca McFarland, American actress
Rebecca McGowan, British taekwondo practitioner
Rebecca McKenna (born 2001), Northern Irish footballer
Rebecca Mead (born 1966), English writer and journalist
Rebecca Meder (born 2002), South African swimmer
Rebecca B. Mellors (1899–1989), educator
Rebecca M. Meluch (born 1956)
Rebecca Jackson Mendoza (born 1973), Australian actress, singer, and dancer
Rebecca Mercuri, computer scientist specializing in computer security and computer forensics
Rebecca Metz, American actress
Rebecca Meyers (born 1994), Paralympic swimmer of the United States
Rebecca Miano (born 1966), Kenyan lawyer and corporate executive
Rebecca Mike, territorial level politician from Pangnirtung, Nunavut
Rebecca Miller (conductor) (born 1975), American conductor
Rebecca Miller (disambiguation), multiple people
Rebecca Miller (footballer) (born 1995), Australian rules footballer
Rebecca Miller (singer), Canadian country music artist
Rebecca Miller (born 1962), American filmmaker and novelist
Rebecca Millett (born 1962), American politician from Maine
Rebacca Minkoff, co-founder of the company, Rebecca Minkoff in 2005
Rebecca Mir (born 1991), German model and a TV presenter
Rebecca Mitchell (disambiguation), multiple people
Rebecca Moesta (born 1956), author of several science fiction books
Rebecca Momin (born 1947), Bangladesh Awami League politician and Member of Parliament
Rebecca Moore (disambiguation), multiple people
Rebecca Jo Morales (born 1962), American artist born in Torrance, California
Rebecca More (born 1980), English pornographic actress and model
Rebecca Morelle, a British science journalist, currently global science correspondent for BBC News
Rebecca Morris (author), New York Times bestselling true-crime author and a TV, radio and print journalist
Rebecca Morris (born 1969), abstract painter
Rebecca Morse (disambiguation), multiple people
Rebecca Morton (1954–2020), American political scientist. She was Professor of Political Science at New York University New York and New York University Abu Dhabi
Rebecca Moses (born 1958), American fashion designer, illustrator, author based in New York City
Rebecca Brewton Motte (1737–1815), plantation owner in South Carolina and townhouse owner in its chief city of Charleston
Rebecca Moynihan (born 1981), Irish Labour Party politician who has been a Senator for the Administrative Panel since April 2020.
Rebecca Mpagi (born 1956), Ugandan military officer and Aircraft Maintenance Engineer, who serves as the Director of Personnel and Administration in the UPDF Air Force. She is credited as the first female in Uganda to qualify as a military aircraft maintenance engineer
Rebecca Muambo (born 1985), Cameroonian  freestyle wrestler. She competed in the women's freestyle 48 kg event at the 2014 Commonwealth Games where she won a bronze medal
Rebecca Mulira (died 2001), Ugandan women's rights advocate and social activist
Rebecca Murray (born 1990), American Paralympic four-time gold medalist and wheelchair basketball player from Richfield, Wisconsin
Rebecca Musser (born 1976), American author and activist. She was a wife of the late Fundamentalist Church of Jesus Christ of Latter Day Saints prophet Rulon Jeffs and escaped before bringing legal proceedings against the church

N
Rebecca Nabutola (born 1959), Permanent Secretary of Kenya's Ministry of Tourism and Wildlife
Rebecca Nagle (fl. 2010s), queer, indigenous activist, writer and speaker
Rebecca Nandwa (fl. 1980s–2010s), Kenyan writer
Rebecca Ndjoze-Ojo (born 1956), Namibian politician and educator
Rebecca Neaves (born 1997), Australian rules footballer
Rebecca Nelson (disambiguation), multiple people
Rebecca Newman (born 1981), English soprano singer and songwriter
Rebecca S. Nichols (1819–1903), American poet
Rebecca Night (born 1985), English actress
Rebeka Nirmali (1964–2014), Sri Lankan cinema, TV, and theater actress
Rebecca Nolin (born 1983), English soccer coach and professional player
Rebecca Northan (fl. 2000s–2010s), Canadian actor, improviser, theatre director, and creative artist
Rebecca Nurse (1621–1692), accused of witchcraft and executed in New England during the Salem Witch Trials of 1692

O
Rebecca O'Brien (born 1957), BAFTA-winning film producer
Rebecca Ohm, United States Air Force officer and fighter pilot
Rebecca Joshua Okwaci, South Sudanese politician
Rebecca Walo Omana (born 1951), Congolese mathematician, professor, and reverend sister
Rebecca O'Mara (born 1977), Irish actress
Rebecca O'Neill (born 1981), New Zealand association football player
Rebecca Odes (born 1969), American media entrepreneur, author, and musician
Rebecca Onie (born 1977), co-founder with Rocco J Perla of The Health Initiative
Rebecca Oppenheimer (born 1972), American astrophysicist
Rebecca Ore (born 1948), American writer
Rebecca Dulcibella Orpen (1830–1923), 19th-century artist
Rebecca Amuge Otengo (born 1966), Ugandan politician
Rebecca Ott (born 1994), Australian-New Zealand professional basketball player
Rebecca Otto (born 1963), American politician who served as State Auditor of Minnesota

P
Rebecca Paisley
Rebecca R. Pallmeyer (born 1954), Chief United States District Judge for the Northern District of Illinois
Rebecca Pan (born 1931), Hong Kong actress and singer
Rebecca Pantaney (born 1975), English badminton player
Rebecca Parchment (born 1982), beauty queen
Rebecca Parkes (born 1994), New Zealand-born Hungarian water polo player
Rebecca Parris (1951–2018), American jazz singer
Rebecca Parrish (1869–1952), American medical missionary and physician in the Philippines
Rebecca Patek, American choreographer and performance artist
Rebecca Paul (born 1950s), currently the President and CEO of the Tennessee Lottery
Rebecca Pavan (born 1990), Canadian female volleyball player
Rebecca Pawel (born 1977), American high school teacher and author of mystery novels
Rebecca Peake (born 1983), English female athlete who competed in the women's shot put
Rebecca Pennell (1821–1890), American educator
Rebecca Penneys (born 1946), American-born pianist of Russian-Jewish descent
Rebecca Talbot Perkins (1866–1956), American businessperson, philanthropist, and activist
Rebecca Perrott (born 1961), New Zealand swimmer
Rebecca Todd Peters, feminist and Christian social ethicist
Rebecca Peters, political advocate for gun control
Rebecca Peterson (born 1995), Swedish professional tennis player
Rebecca Pidgeon (born 1965), American actress, singer, and songwriter
Rebecca Piekkari (born 1967), Finnish organizational theorist and professor
Rebecca Pike (born 1971), British journalist
Rebecca Pitcher (born 1972), American musical theatre actress
Rebecca Podio, American beauty pageant titleholder from Newcastle, Wyoming
Rebecca Podos, American author of young adult fiction
Rebecca Pomroy (1817–1884), American nurse and philanthropist
Rebecca Posner (1929–2018), British philologist, linguist and academic
Rebecca Pow (born 1960), British Conservative Party politician
Rebecca Minot Prescott (1743–1813), second wife of United States Founding Father Roger Sherman
Rebecca Preston (born 1979), Australian triathlete
Rebecca Price (disambiguation), multiple people
Rebecca Prichard (born 1971)
Rebecca Priestley, New Zealand academic, science historian, and writer
Rebecca S. Pringle (born 1955), American teacher and trade union leader
Rebecca Privitelli (born 1995), Australian rules footballer
Rebecca Probert (born 1973)
Rebecca Pronsky (born 1980), singer-songwriter from Brooklyn, New York
Rebecca Protten (died 1780), Caribbean Moravian evangelist and pioneer missionary

Q
Rebecca Quick (born 1972), American television journalist/newscaster and co-anchorwoman of CNBC's financial news shows Squawk Box and On the Money
Rebecca Quinn (disambiguation)

R
Rebecca B. Rankin (1887–1965), director of the New York City's Municipal Reference Library for thirty-two years
Rebecca Rasmussen, American fiction writer
Rebecca Rather, American pastry chef, restaurateur, and cookbook author
Rebecca Rawson (1656–1692), heroine of the 1849 book Leaves from Margaret Smith's Journal, in the Province of Massachusetts Bay (by John G. Whittier)
Rebecca Raybould (born 1998), British female track cyclist
Rebecca Redfern (born 1999), British visually impaired para-swimmer
Rebecca Reeve (born 1994), Australian female volleyball player. She is part of the Australia women's national volleyball team.
Rebecca Reid, British actress and model
Rebecca Reimer, American politician and a Republican member of the South Dakota House of Representatives
Rebecca Hourwich Reyher (1897–1987), author, lecturer, and suffragist. She was the head of the New York and Boston offices of the National Woman's Party
Rebecca Reynolds (disambiguation), multiple people
Rebecca Rhynhart, American politician from Pennsylvania
Rebecca Rice (1947–2002), in Washington, DC
Rebecca Richards, Civil Liberties and Privacy Officer at the National Security Agency
Rebecca Richards-Kortum (born 1964), American bioengineer and the Malcolm Gillis University Professor at Rice University
Rebecca Pillai Riddell, Canadian clinical psychologist and a basic-behavioural scientist
Rebecca Rigg (born 1967), Australian actress
Rebecca Riggs, Australian actress
Rebecca W. Rimel (born 1951), president and CEO of The Pew Charitable Trusts
Rebecca Rimmington (born 1983), English sportsperson, a competitive cyclist
Rebecca Ringquist (born 1949), Brooklyn-based visual artist
Rebecca Rios (born 1967), American Democratic politician in the Arizona State Senate
Rebecca Rippon (born 1978), Australian water polo player
Rebecca Rippy (born 1977)
Rebecca Rittenhouse (born 1988), American actress
Rebecca Ritters (born 1984), Australian journalist
Rebecca Rivera (born 1995), Filipino-Canadian volleyball athlete
Rebecca Rixon (born 2000), Maltese international lawn bowler
Rebecca Roache, British philosopher and lecturer
Rebecca Roanhorse (born 1971), American science fiction and fantasy writer
Rebecca Roberts (born 1970), American journalist
Rebecca Robinson (disambiguation), multiple people
Rebecca Robisch (born 1988), German triathlete
Rebecca Roche (born 1965), association football goalkeeper
Rebecca Roeber (1958–2019), American politician
Rebecca Rolfe (cricketer) (born 1986), Irish cricketer
Rebecca Rolls (born 1975), New Zealand cricketer and association footballer
Rebecca Romero (born 1980), English sportswoman
Rebecca Romijn (born 1972), American actress and model
Rebecca Root (born 1969), English actress, comedian and voice coach
Rebecca Rose (born 1980), American sculptor
Rebecca Rosenblum (born 1978), Canadian author
Rebecca Rusch (born 1968), American ultra endurance pro athlete
Rebecca Rush (1779–1850), American writer
Rebecca Russo (born 1994), American-born women's ice hockey player
Rebecca de Ruvo (born 1969), Swedish TV presenter, actress, artist and model
Rebecca Ryan (born 1991), English actress

S
Rebecca Saire (born 1963), British actress and writer
Rebecca Saldaña, American politician in the Washington State Senate
Rebecca Salter (born 1955), British abstract artist
Rebecca Sandefur, American sociologist
Rebecca Sanders (born 1982), Australian field hockey player
Rebecca Santhosh (born 1998), Indian film and television actress
Rebecca Sarker (born 1975), English actress
Rebecca Sattin (born 1980), Australian rower
Rebecca Saunders (born 1967), London-born composer
Rebecca Scattergood Savery (1770–1855), American quilter
Rebecca Saxe, professor of cognitive neuroscience
Rebecca Schaeffer (1967–1989), American model and actress
Rebecca Scheiner, German stage director of operas and musicals
Rebecca Scheja (born 1989), Swedish actor, disc jockey, singer, songwriter and record producer
Rebecca Scherm, American author
Rebecca Schiffman (born 1982), singer-songwriter, jewelry designer, and visual artist
Rebecca Schroeter (1751–1826), amateur musician
Rebecca Schull (born 1929), American stage, film and television actress
Rebecca Schulz, Canadian politician in the Alberta Legislature
Rebecca Scott (disambiguation), multiple people
Rebecca Scown (born 1983), professional rower from New Zealand
Rebecca Scroggs (born 1982), English actress
Rebecca Seal, American magazine editor and freelance journalist
Rebecca Seawright (born 1962), member of the New York State Assembly
Rebecca Seiferle, American poet
Rebecca Selkirk (born 1993), South African chess player
Rebecca Senf (born 1972), American writer and curator
Rebecca Shanahan, New South Wales-based artist and arts educator
Rebecca Sharp (disambiguation), multiple people
Rebecca Shaw (disambiguation), multiple people
Rebecca Shearing (born 1992), Scottish pop singer
Rebecca Shelley (1887–1984), pacifist who lost American citizenship when she married a German national
Rebecca Shipley, British mathematician and professor of healthcare engineering
Rebecca Shoichet (born 1975), Canadian voice actress and singer
Rebecca Shorten (born 1993), British rower
Rebecca Simmons, Texas attorney and special justice of the Supreme Court of Texas
Rebecca Simonsson (born 1985), Swedish singer, designer, glamour model, TV-host and blogger
Rebecca Simpson (born 1982), association football player who represented New Zealand at international level
Rebecca Sinclair (disambiguation), multiple people
Rebecca Singh (born 1975)
Rebecca Sjöwall, American opera singer and recording artist
Rebecca Skloot (born 1972), American science writer who specializes in science and medicine
Rebeccah Slater, British neuroscientist and academic
Rebecca Slaughter (born c. 1983), acting chair of the U.S. Federal Trade Commission
Rebecca Smart (born 1976), Australian actress
Rebecca Smith (disambiguation), multiple people
Rebecca Snyder (disambiguation), multiple people
Rebecca Sockbeson (born 1972), Wabanaki scholar and activist
Rebecca Soler, American voice actress based in the New York City area
Rebecca Solnit (born 1961), American writer
Rebecca Solomon (1832–1886), 19th-century English Pre-Raphaelite draftsman, illustrator, engraver, and painter of social injustices
Rebecca Soni (born 1987), American competition swimmer
Rebecca Sorensen (born 1972), American skeleton racer
Rebecca Soumeru (born 1981), Dutch softball player
Rebecca Sowden (born 1981), association football player for New Zealand
Rebecca Spence (triathlete) (born 1988), New Zealand triathlete
Rebecca Spence, American actress
Rebecca Spencer (singer) (born 1960), American singer and actress
Rebecca Spencer (born 1991), English female football goalkeeper for FA WSL club Tottenham Hotspur
Rebecca Spikings-Goldsman (died 2010), American film producer and filmmaker
Rebecca Spindler, head of science and conservation at non-profit conservation organisation Bush Heritage Australia
Rebecca Buffum Spring (1811–1911), Quaker abolitionist, educational reformer, feminist, and women's suffrage activist
Rebecca Ruter Springer (1832–1904), American author
Rebecca Šramková (born 1996), Slovak tennis player
Rebecca St. James (born 1977), Australian Christian pop rock singer-songwriter and actress
Rebecca Staab (born 1961), American actress
Rebecca Stead (born 1968), American writer of fiction for children and teens
Rebecca Steele (disambiguation), multiple people
Rebecca Stenberg (born 1992), Swedish ice hockey player
Rebecca Stephens (disambiguation), multiple people
Rebecca Stevens (disambiguation), multiple people
Rebecca Stirm (born 1993), Belizean fashion designer
Rebecca Stokell (born 2000), Irish cricketer
Rebecca Storm (born 1958), British singer and musical theatre actress
Rebecca Stott (born 1964)
Rebecca Strickson, illustrator and designer
Rebecca Strong (1843–1944), English nurse who pioneered preliminary training for nurses
Rebecca Sugar (born 1987), American animator, director, screenwriter, producer, and singer-songwriter
Rebecca Sullivan (born 1972), Australian judoka
Rebecca Surman
Rebecca Swan (born 1970), American filmmaker and screenwriter
Rebecca Sweetman, Professor of Ancient History and Archaeology at the University of St Andrews
Rebecca Swift (?–2017), British poet and essayist
Rebecca Wragg Sykes, British Paleolithic archaeologist, broadcaster, popular science writer and author

T
Rebecca Taichman, American theatre director
Rebecca Talen (born 1993), Dutch professional racing cyclist. She is the daughter of the cyclist John Talen
Rebecca Tarbotton (1973–2012), Canadian environmental, human rights, and food activist
Rebecca Reichmann Tavares, worked in the field of development, race relations, and women's rights
Rebecca Tavo (born 1983), Australian, dual international, rugby union and Touch football player
Rebecca Taylor (politician) (born 1975), British health researcher and Liberal Democrat politician
Rebecca Stiles Taylor (1879–1958), American journalist, social worker, and educator
Rebecca Taylor (born 1969), New Zealand-born fashion designer based in New York City, United States
Rebecca Tegg (born 1985), association football player who represented New Zealand at international level
Rebecca Thomas (born 1984), American filmmaker and television director
Rebecca Thompson, American physicist, popular science writer and head of the Office of Education and Public Outreach at Fermilab
Rebecca Vega Thurber, American microbial ecologist and coral reef scientist
Rebecca Harrell Tickell (born 1980), producer, director, actress, singer, and environmental activist
Rebecca bat Meir Tiktiner, Yiddish writer
Rebecca Tobey (born 1948), American artist from Santa Fe, New Mexico, who creates ceramic, brass, and patina animal sculptures in both modern and abstract styles
Rebecca Tobin (born 1988), American professional basketball player
Rebecca Toolan (born 1939), American television actress
Rebecca Tope (born 1964), British crime novelist and journalist
Rebecca Torr (born 1990), snowboarder from New Zealand
Rebecca Traister (born 1975), American author and columnist
Rebecca Travers (1609–1688), born in 1609, the daughter of a Baptist named Booth, and studied the Bible from the age of six
Rebecca Trehearn, actress
Rebecca Treiman, American psychologist
Rebecca Trethowan (born 1985), female rugby union player
Rebecca C. Tuite, British author based in Los Angeles
Rebecca Tunney (born 1996), British artistic gymnast who competed at the 2012 Summer Olympics
Rebecca Turner, British swimmer
Rebecca Tushnet (born 1973), law professor at Harvard Law School
Rebecca Twigg (born 1963), American racing cyclist

V
Rebecca Valadez (fl. 1990s–2000s), American singer and actress
Rebecca Newbold Van Trump (1839–1935), American painter of portraits and miniatures
Rebecca Van Asch (born 1988), Australian Lawn bowler
Rebecca van der Vegt (born 1964), association football player
Rebecca Vassarotti (born 1972), member of parliament in the Australian Capital Territory Legislative Assembly
Rebecca Vigil-Giron (born 1954), American politician who served as the Secretary of State of New Mexico
Rebecca Vincent (born 1983), American journalist and human rights activist
Rebecca Vint (born 1992), Canadian-born women's ice hockey player

W
Rebecca Waldecker (born 1979), German mathematician specializing in group theory
Rebecca Walker (disambiguation), multiple people
Rebecca Wallace-Segall, journalist and the founding executive director of Writopia Lab
Rebecca Walter (born 1987), Australian volleyball player
Rebecca Walton (born 1958), regional director of the British Council
Rebecca Wanzo (born 1975), American academic
Rebecca Ward (born 1990), American sabre fencer
Rebecca Wardell (born 1977), New Zealand athlete who competes in the combined events
Rebecca Warren (born 1965), British visual artist and sculptor
Rebecca Watson (born 1980), American blogger and podcast host
Rebecca Watts (born 1983), British poet
Rebecca Norris Webb (born 1956), American photographer
Rebecca Webster (born 2000), Australian rules footballer with the Geelong Football Club in the AFL Women's (AFLW)
Rebecca Wee, American poet, and associate professor of creative writing
Rebecca Weintraub (1873–1952), actress in the Yiddish theater who was born in Odessa, Russian Empire
Rebecca Welch (born 1980s), English football referee
Rebecca Welles (1928–2017), American television and film actress
Rebecca Wells (born 1953), American author, actor, and playwright
Rebecca West (1892–1983), British author, journalist, literary critic, and travel writer
Rebecca Wheatley (born 1965), British actress and musician
Rebecca Whisnant, professor and chair of the philosophy department at the University of Dayton
Rebecca White (born 1983), Australian politician in the Tasmanian parliament
Rebecca White (Vermont politician), American politician in the Vermont House of Representatives
Rebecca Wiasak (born 1984), Australian track cyclist
Rebecca Wigfield (born 1988), English international bowls player
Rebecca Wilcox (born 1980), English television presenter, mainly for the BBC
Rebecca Willett, American statistician and computer scientist
Rebecca Williams (disambiguation), multiple people
Rebecca Willis (born 1972), professor of practice at University of Lancaster
Rebecca Wilson (curator), art curator and editor
Rebecca Wilson (1961–2016), Australian sports journalist, radio and television broadcaster and personality
Rebecca Win (born 1986), Burmese singer and model
Rebecca Winckworth, Irish singer
Rebecca Wing (born 1992), British artistic gymnast from Farnborough, Hampshire
Rebecca Winters (pioneer) (1799–1852), Mormon pioneer who with her family left the eastern United States to emigrate to the Salt Lake Valley with other Latter-day Saints
Rebecca Winters (born 1940), for Harlequin Enterprises Ltd
Rebecca Wirfs-Brock (born 1953), American software engineer
Rebecca Wisocky (born 1971), American film, television and stage actress
Rebecca Wittmann (born 1970), historian, writer, and professor
Rebecca Wolff (born 1967), poet, fiction writer, and editor
Rebecca Anne Womeldorf, American lawyer and Reporter of Decisions of the United States Supreme Court
Rebecca Womersley (born 1993), English professional racing cyclist
Rebecca Worthley (born 1981)
Rebecca N. Wright (born 1967), American computer scientist
Rebecca Wright (1947–2006), American ballerina, teacher, choreographer and ballet school director

Y
Rebecca Yeh (fl. 2010s), American pageant titleholder
Rebecca Ynares (born 1949), Filipina politician
Rebecca Young (disambiguation)

Z
Rebecca Zadig (born 1982), Swedish singer
Rebecca Zahau (1979–2011), American female murder victim
Rebecca Zanetti (fl. 1990s–2010s), American author in various romance genres
Rebecca Zhu (born 1987), Chinese-born Hong Kong actress and a beauty pageant titleholder
Rebecca Zlotowski (born 1980), French film director and screenwriter
Rebecca Zorach (born 1969), American art historian and professor
Rebecca Zwick (fl. 1990s–2010s), researcher in educational assessment and psychometrics

Fictional characters
 Rebeca Arthur, a character in American the TV series Perfect Strangers
 Rebecca Banner, mother of Bruce Banner (aka the Hulk) in Marvel Comics
 Rebecca Bishop (disambiguation), multiple fictional characters
 Rebecca Bowman (disambiguation), multiple fictional characters
 Rebecca "Becky" Connor, from the TV sitcom Roseanne
 Rebecca Harper, character on the ABC television series Brothers & Sisters, portrayed by Emily VanCamp
 Rebecca Hotchkiss, character on the NBC/DirecTV daytime drama, Passions
 Rebecca Howe, a character from the American television sitcom Cheers, portrayed by Kirstie Alley
 Rebecca Anne "Annie" January, character from the American comic and television franchise The Boys, portrayed by Erin Moriarty
 Rebecca Napier, character from the Australian soap opera Neighbours, played by Jane Hall
 Rebecca Jane Nash (née Fisher), character from the Australian soap opera Home and Away
 Rebecca von Lahnstein, character on the German soap opera Verbotene Liebe (Forbidden Love) Rebecca 'Becky' Sharp the anti-heroine in the 1847 novel Vanity Fair and numerous adaptations into other media
 Rebecca Sutter, a character from the American legal thriller How to Get Away with Murder, portrayed by Katie Findlay
 Rebecca Sutter, alias of Pamela Rebecca Barnes on the 2012 revival of Dallas.
 Rebecca "Revy" Lee, a main character from the manga and anime series, Black Lagoon Rebecca, a character from the manga and anime series, One Piece Rebecca Randall, a main supporting character from the manga and anime series Dragonar Academy Rebecca Scarlet, a character from the manga and anime series, Black Clover Rebecca Bluegarden, the main female protagonist from the manga and anime series, Edens Zero Rebecca, a main supporting character from the anime series Cyberpunk: Edgerunners''

See also
Rebecca, biblical figure
Rebecca (disambiguation)
 Wikipedia articles whose title starts with Rebecca

Rebecca